Jakob Sildnik (4 February 1883 – 25 March 1973) was an Estonian photographer and filmmaker, based in Tartu. Together with Fjodor Ljubovski, he directed one of the first Estonian films, the short drama Must teemant (literally The Black Diamond), released in 1923.

Sildnik was murdered in 1973, at the age of 90.

References

External links

1883 births
1973 deaths
Estonian film directors
Estonian photographers
Estonian victims of crime
Estonian murder victims
People murdered in Estonia
1970s murders in Estonia
1973 crimes in Estonia
1973 murders in Europe